Sentience is the ability to perceive subjectively.

Sentient may also refer to:

 Sentient (intelligence analysis system), an automated intelligence analysis system under development by the National Reconnaissance Office (NRO) of the United States federal government
 Sentient (video game), a videogame developed by Psygnosis in 1997 for the PlayStation and PC
 Sentient computing, a form of ubiquitous computing which uses sensors to perceive its environment and react accordingly
 Sentient Information Systems, a Dutch software company specialized in data mining
 Sentient diet, also referred to as Sattvic diet
 Sentients, an alien race from Hot Wheels Battle Force 5
 The Sentients, a faction in the online game Warframe, described as a race of terraforming machines from the Tau system
 Sentience (EP), an EP by electronic music producer 1788-L.